Esteban Ezequiel Espíndola López (born 22 March 1992) is an Argentine professional footballer who plays as a centre-back.

Club career
Espíndola began his career with Argentine Primera División club River Plate, appearing on the bench twice in the league prior to making his debut in the 2012–13 Copa Argentina against Estudiantes. In July 2013, Espíndola joined fellow top-flight team Atlético de Rafaela on loan. Over the course of the 2013–14 Argentine Primera División season he made just three appearances for Rafaela. 2014 saw him join Primera B Nacional's Nueva Chicago on a permanent deal, however he left less than a year later without making an appearance. In February 2015, Espíndola joined Primera División side Belgrano.

After twenty appearances in all competitions in his first three seasons with Belgrano, Espíndola was loaned out to Primera B Nacional team San Martín in August 2017. His campaign with the club ended with promotion to the top division. Olimpia of the Liga Nacional in Honduras completed the signing of Espíndola on 18 August 2018. He participated in fourteen fixtures for Olimpia, before terminating his contract in December. In January 2019, Espíndola agreed to sign for Racing de Córdoba in Argentina's Torneo Federal A. He suffered relegation with them. Espíndola then went back to Honduras with Marathón.

On 11 August 2019, Espíndola scored the first goal of his senior career during a 1–1 draw with former club Olimpia. After further strikes against Honduras Progreso and Real Sociedad, Espíndola switched Honduras for Costa Rica on 9 July 2020 by agreeing terms with Saprissa. He signed a one-year contract and received the shirt number five.

International career
Espíndola has represented Argentina at U15 and U17 level, making three appearances for the latter at the 2009 FIFA U-17 World Cup in Nigeria. He scored in the aforementioned tournament, converting a penalty in a group stage match against Germany.

Career statistics
.

Honours

Club
River Plate
U-20 Copa Libertadores: 2012

Saprissa
Liga FPD: Clausura 2021

References

External links

1992 births
Living people
People from San Martín, Buenos Aires
Argentine footballers
Argentina youth international footballers
Association football defenders
Argentine expatriate footballers
Expatriate footballers in Honduras
Expatriate footballers in Costa Rica
Argentine expatriate sportspeople in Honduras
Argentine expatriate sportspeople in Costa Rica
Argentine Primera División players
Primera Nacional players
Liga Nacional de Fútbol Profesional de Honduras players
Torneo Federal A players
Club Atlético River Plate footballers
Atlético de Rafaela footballers
Nueva Chicago footballers
Club Atlético Belgrano footballers
San Martín de Tucumán footballers
C.D. Olimpia players
Racing de Córdoba footballers
C.D. Marathón players
Deportivo Saprissa players
Sportspeople from Buenos Aires Province